Khasara is a Pakistani romantic drama aired on ARY Digital. It focuses on four characters who are initially friends, but then get intertwined into a relation which is closer than friends – an affair of money in the name of love. The show has gained critical acclaim for its storyline. The show aired Tuesday evenings (switched to Thursday evenings in Ramzan) in a double-episode (two episodes at once) format.

Plot 
Sila and Moonis are a simple couple who live in a simple part of Karachi. Sila wants a lavish lifestyle and chases her upscale desires. Moonis is a happy railway employee who is content with the way his life is. Moonis' childhood best friend Mohtasim and wife Linta come to visit. Mohtasim is a rich businessman who is a playboy and flirts with every woman. His wife Linta is rich and spoiled and loves to brag about how she is so rich. Mohtasim and Linta visit Sila and Moonis and spoil the couple – getting gifts for them, their kids and giving money. Mohtasim begins to flirt with Sila knowing he can get her. Sila is falling for him, and gets conflicted as to what she should do. She now wants to get with Mohtasim since he has a lot of money to support her lavish dreams. Slowly, sila and mohtasim begin dating. And it is soon revealed to moonis who is heartbroken but decides to let her leave. She settles down with mohtasim, and enjoys the new luxury lifestyle. They face issues as they demand child's custody from moonis as well as linta's behaviour with sila. One evening, drunk mohtasim meets a car and accident and dies. Linta informs this to sila and she cries and regrets. Sje goes back to mohtasim who still loves her somehow but is reluctant to start life all over again with her. Sila goes to pray in a darga where she spends hours crying and telling herself that moonis may be not so well-off, his love was unconditional. Realising that she can't make up for this loss, khasara, she slowly dies.

Cast 

 Mikaal Zulfiqar as Mutasim
 Sarwat Gilani as Linta
 Junaid Khan as Moonis
 Sonia Mishal as Sila
 Hassam Khan as Azhar
 Kiran Ashfaq as Areeba
 Hajra Khan as Arzoo
 Kashef Shahan

Soundtrack

The title song was sung by Rahat Fateh Ali Khan. The music was composed by Soch Band and the lyrics were written by Adnan Dhool.

International release
The show was dubbed in Arabic and is available as VOD on shahid.net by the title خسارة.

Awards and nominations

References

External links 

2018 Pakistani television series debuts